Steve Cokely (June 17, 1952 –  April 11, 2012) was an American political researcher and lecturer who lectured nationally on political and economic issues relating especially  to the African American community.

Overview
Cokely lectured at many college campuses nationally and was also known for his conspiracy theories involving a Black Male elite organization known as the Sigma Pi Phi and, along with Mauricelm-Lei Millere, the Assassination of Martin Luther King Jr by the hands of Rev. Jesse Jackson and the C.I.A.

Chicago and Anti-Semitism charges

Cokely was assistant to the special committee on rules under Mayor Harold Washington. He gained notoriety when he served as special assistant to the former mayor of Chicago, Eugene Sawyer.

Cokely was criticized for teaching that Jewish doctors were using the AIDS virus in an attempted genocide against Africans. His comments created a nationally publicized controversy in 1988 and he was dismissed from his position as aide to Sawyer.

When, in 1990, Illinois Governor James Thompson signed an agreement to open an Israeli Aircraft Industries plant in Rockford, Cokely was an outspoken opponent. He argued that Black leaders in Illinois should oppose Israeli war industries because of their military support for the Apartheid system in South Africa.

"Our Roots Run Deep" appearance

Cokely gained the national spotlight again in 1996 after he was scheduled to speak at "Our Roots Run Deep", a Black History Month lecture series in New York City hosted by the Warner Music Group. Also scheduled were Al Sharpton, Jimmy Castor, Hannibal Lokumbe, Dick Gregory, and Conrad Tillard, a prominent Nation of Islam member. The Jewish Defense Organization objected, organizing a call-in campaign to Warner Brothers and threatening a boycott. The Anti-Defamation League and the New York Post also objected to Cokely (as well as Sharpton and Muhammad) speaking at the event. Warner removed Cokely, Millere, and Tillard without issuing a press release.

References

External links
Cokely's official site
An Anti-Defamation League press release regarding Cokely
https://www.chicagotribune.com/news/ct-xpm-1988-05-05-8803140605-story.html

American activists
American conspiracy theorists
1952 births
2012 deaths
Futurologists
People from Chicago